Santha Kumari (born Vellaala Subbamma; 17 May 1920 – 16 January 2006) was an Indian musical artist and actress. She was married to the Telugu film director and producer P. Pullayya.

Early years
Vellaala Subbamma was born in Proddatur town, (Kadapa District, Andhra Pradesh) to Sreenivasa Rao and Pedda Narasamma. Her father was an actor and her mother was a classical music singer. Santhakumari learned classical music and violin under the guidance of Professor P. Sambamurthy and was a classmate of D. K. Pattammal. She joined a drama troupe and was an AIR artiste by the age of sixteen. She came to Madras (now Chennai) to pursue a career in music. She found employment in Vidyodaya School for a remuneration of Rs 2 per month. She sang along with music director S. Rajeswara Rao for AIR.

Film career
P. V. Das, producer and director of Mayabazaar (also known as Sasirekhaa Parinayam) was scouting for a young girl to play Sasirekha. He saw Subbamma at a music concert. At the time, she was teaching music at Vidyodaya School, Madras. Das liked her mellifluous voice and innocence, essential qualities to portray Sasirekha's character. Her parents were against her joining films. They wanted to see her as classical singer. Subbamma was adamant and resorted to hunger strike. On the fourth day they relented. Das changed her name as Santhakumari. The film released in 1936.

In the following year she was a member of the cast of Sarangadhara, a film that was directed by P. Pullayya, whom she met and married in the same year.

The couple used the name of PadmaSree Pictures, named after their daughter Padma, for some of their movies and had success with films such as Jayabheri (1959), Sri Venkateswara Mahatyam (1960), and Preminchi Choodu (1965). Santhakumari acted in most of the movies that were made by her husband, including Shavukaru (1950), Ardhangi (1955), Sri Venkateswara Mahatyam (1960), Santhi Nivasam (1960), and Ramudu Bheemudu (1964).

In 1947, the couple started the Ragini Pictures banner with Bheemavarapu Narasimha Rao and Bhakta Jana. They made 22 films on both PadmaSree and Ragini banners put together.

She played many lead and supporting roles, with around 250 appearances in total.

Awards and recognition
For her contributions to Telugu Cinema, Santha Kumari was awarded the Raghupathi Venkaiah Award in 1998.

Filmography
This is partial filmography of Santha Kumari. Kindly help expanding it.

See also
 Raghupathi Venkaiah Award

References

External links
 
 Santha Kumari Profile - Telugu Cinema
 
  - A song scene from Piriyavidai (1975) with Santhakumari acting and singing

1920 births
2006 deaths
20th-century Indian actresses
Indian women playback singers
Indian women film producers
Film producers from Andhra Pradesh
Telugu playback singers
People from Kadapa district
20th-century Indian singers
Actresses in Telugu cinema
Actresses in Tamil cinema
Indian film actresses
Singers from Andhra Pradesh
Actresses from Andhra Pradesh
20th-century Indian women singers
Film musicians from Andhra Pradesh
Businesswomen from Andhra Pradesh
Women musicians from Andhra Pradesh